Private Peat is a lost 1918 American silent biographical drama film directed by Edward José and written by and starring Harold R. Peat. It was produced by Adolph Zukor and Jesse Lasky.

Synopsis
The film is based on the book Private Peat by Harold R. Peat, recalling his WW1 experiences as one of the first Americans to enlist in the conflict when American joined the war. Peat was from Canada but is presented as an all-American boy for patriotism and propaganda. The feature primarily consisted of newsreel footage.

Cast
Harold R. Peat as Himself
Miriam Fouche as Mrs. Mary Peat
William Sorelle as Old Bill (credited as William J. Sorelle)
Edwin J. Grant (Undetermined Role)

References

External links

Copies of his book and other paraphernalia of Harold R. Peat (archived)
Lantern or glass slide (archived)

1918 films
American silent feature films
Lost American films
Films directed by Edward José
Famous Players-Lasky films
Paramount Pictures films
American black-and-white films
American biographical drama films
1910s biographical drama films
1918 drama films
1910s American films
Silent American drama films